Destination Unknown is a 1933 American pre-Code drama film directed by Tay Garnett and written by Tom Buckingham. The film stars Pat O'Brien, Ralph Bellamy, Alan Hale, Sr., Russell Hopton, Tom Brown and Betty Compson. The film was released on April 1, 1933, by Universal Pictures.

Plot
During a storm in the Pacific Ocean, the captain and the first helmsman on the sailing ship Prince Rupert are killed. The surviving crew is disoriented after the storm and the ship's water supplies are controlled by the cold-blooded Matt Brennan. Finally, a stowaway appears who knows other water supplies and navigates the ship to safe areas according to the stars. At the end of the film he finally disappears without a trace.

Cast 
Pat O'Brien as Matt Brennan
Ralph Bellamy as Stowaway
Alan Hale, Sr. as Lundstrom
Russell Hopton as Georgie
Tom Brown as Johnny
Betty Compson as Ruby Smith
Noel Madison as Maxie
Stanley Fields as Gattallo
Rollo Lloyd as Dr. Fram
Willard Robertson as Joe Shano
Charles Middleton as Turk
Richard Alexander as Alex
Forrester Harvey as Ring
George Regas as Tauru

References

External links 
 

1933 films
1930s English-language films
American drama films
1933 drama films
Universal Pictures films
Films directed by Tay Garnett
Seafaring films
American black-and-white films
1930s American films